Kartich Kola (also Romanized as Kartīch Kolā) is a village in Gatab-e Jonubi Rural District, Gatab District, Babol County, Mazandaran Province, Iran. At the 2006 census, its population was 305, in 81 families.

References 

Populated places in Babol County